The Good Cities (French: Bonnes Villes) were the most important cities of the Prince-Bishopric of Liège (980-1795). If considered a Good City, the city was allowed to build a city wall; partake in the States of Liège; and erect a perron symbolising the autonomy and freedom of Liège.

In 1651 the Good Cities numbered 23, and they were grouped in either the so-called villes thioises (Low Dietsch cities, which contemporarily would be termed Dutch or Flemish) and the villes françoises (contemporarily French or Walloon cities). All of these Good Cities are located within present-day Belgium.

Two other major cities of the Prince-Bishopric had a special statute, which differentiated them from the Good Cities as they were not allowed to be represented at the States of Liège. These two were part of the Condominium of Maastricht, an area of joint sovereignty shared by the Prince-Bishopric of Liège and the Duchy of Brabant.

The cities

Villes thioises

{|class="wikitable plainrowheaders" style="text-align:center"
|-
! scope="col" rowspan="2" | City
! scope="col" colspan="2" | Current Belgian:
|-
! scope="col" width="60" | Province
! scope="col" width="60" | Region
|-
| Beringen || Limburg || Flemish
|-
| Bilzen || Limburg || Flemish
|-
| Borgloon(then named Loon) || Limburg || Flemish
|-
| Bree || Limburg || Flemish
|-
| Hamont || Limburg || Flemish
|-
| Hasselt || Limburg || Flemish
|-
| Herk-de-Stad || Limburg || Flemish
|-
| Maaseik || Limburg || Flemish
|-
| Peer || Limburg || Flemish
|-
| Sint-Truiden || Limburg || Flemish
|-
| Stokkem || Limburg || Flemish
|-
| Tongeren || Limburg || Flemish
|-
|}

Villes françoises

{|class="wikitable plainrowheaders" style="text-align:center"
|-
! scope="col" rowspan="2" | City
! scope="col" colspan="2" | Current Belgian:
|-
! scope="col" width="60" | Province
! scope="col" width="60" | Region
|-
| Châtelet || Hainaut || Wallonia
|-
| Ciney || Namur || Wallonia
|-
| Couvin || Namur || Wallonia
|-
| Dinant || Namur || Wallonia
|-
| Fosses-la-Ville || Namur || Wallonia
|-
| Huy || Liège || Wallonia
|-
| Liège || Liège || Wallonia
|-
| Thuin || Hainaut || Wallonia
|-
| Verviers || Liège || Wallonia
|-
| Visé || Liège || Wallonia
|-
| Waremme || Liège || Wallonia
|-
|}

Cities with a special statute

The Condominium of Maastrichtof which the Prince-Bishopric shared a joint authority with the Duchy of Brabant and later the Dutch Republicincluded two cities with a special statute.

{|class="wikitable plainrowheaders" style="text-align:center"
|-
! scope="col" rowspan="2" | City
! scope="col" colspan="2" | Current:
|-
! scope="col" width="60" | Province(Country)
! scope="col" width="60" | Region
|-
| Bouillon || Luxembourg (Belgium) || Wallonia
|-
| Maastricht || Limburg (Netherlands) || 
|-
|}

References

Prince-Bishopric of Liège